Alberic III of Dammartin (Aubry de Dammartin) ( – 19 September 1200) was a French count and son of Alberic II, Count of Dammartin, and Clémence de Bar, daughter of Reginald I, Count of Bar. 

He married Mathilde, heiress to the county of Clermont and daughter of Renaud II, Count of Clermont. They had:
 Renaud I, Count of Dammartin (c. 1165–1227), married 1) Marie de Châtillon and 2) Ide de Lorraine with whom he had Matilda II, Countess of Boulogne, Queen of Portugal
 Alix de Dammartin (1170–1237), married Jean, Châtelain de Trie
 Simon of Dammartin (1180 – 21 September 1239), married Marie, Countess of Ponthieu father of Joan, Countess of Ponthieu, Queen of Castile and Leon.
 Julia of Dammartin, married Hugh de Gournay
 Agnes of Dammartin, married William de Fiennes

References

Sources

Counts of Dammartin
Medieval French nobility
12th-century French people
1200 deaths
Year of birth unknown
House of Dammartin